Kosuke Sugimoto (born 2 December 1994) is a Japanese freestyle skier. He competed in the 2022 Winter Olympics. 

Sugimoto earned two national championships silver medals in 2020 (moguls, dual moguls). In 39 World Cup starts, he earned his first podium finish on 13 January 2022 in Deer Valley (third). He currently resides in Nagano.

References

External links

1994 births
Living people
Freestyle skiers at the 2022 Winter Olympics
Japanese male freestyle skiers
Olympic freestyle skiers of Japan
Sportspeople from Shizuoka Prefecture
21st-century Japanese people
20th-century Japanese people